Bernd is a Low German short form of the given name Bernhard (English Bernard).

List of persons with given name Bernd
The following people share the name Bernd.

Bernd Brückler (born 1981), Austrian hockey player
Bernd Eichinger (1949–2011), German film producer
Bernd Heinrich (born 1940), biologist and author at the University of Vermont
Bernd Helmschrot (born 1947), German football player
Bernd Herzsprung (born 1942), German actor
Bernd Hölzenbein (born 1946), German football player
Bernd Jeffré (born 1964), German paracyclist
Bernd Klenke (born 1946), German sport sailor
Bernd Posselt (born 1956), German politician (CSU)
Bernd Schneider (footballer) (born 1973), German football player
Bernd Schneider (racing driver) (born 1964), German racecar driver
Bernd Schröder (born 1942), German football manager
Bernd Schuster (born 1959), German football manager and former player
Bernd Stange (born 1948), German football manager
Bernd Stelter (born 1961), German comedian 
Bernd Michael Rode (born 1946), Austrian chemistry professor
Bernd Rosemeyer (1909–1938), German racecar driver
Bernd Alois Zimmermann (1918–1970), German composer
Bernd Sturmfels (born 1962), mathematician teaching at UC Berkeley
Bernd Leno (born 1992), German football player, goalkeeper playing for Arsenal F.C.
Thomas Anders (born 1963), German singer, lead singer of Modern Talking, birth name is Bernd

Characters
Bernd das Brot, German children's television character
Bernd Doppler, character in TV series Dark

See also
Bernt
Save Bernd, a humor website

German masculine given names